The lubber fiend, Lob, lubberkin, lurdane or Lob Lie-By-The-Fire is a legendary creature of English folklore that is similar to the "brownie"  (or "Urisk") of Scotland and northern England, the "hob" of northern England and the Scottish Borders, the Slavic "domovoi" and Scandinavian "tomte". It has been related also to Robin Goodfellow, and Hobgoblins. It is best known for being mentioned by John Milton.

The lubberkin is typically described as a large, hairy man with a tail who performs housework in exchange for a saucer of milk and a place in front of the fire. One story claims he is the giant son of a witch and the Devil.

The abbey lubber is a minor demon that haunts the wine cellars and kitchens of abbeys, tempting the monks into drunkenness, gluttony and lasciviousness. The best known abbey lubber tale is that of Friar Rush.

Lubber fiend in literature
The lubber fiend appears also in The Red Axe by S. R. Crockett (1900)

Lob is the title of a poem by Edward Thomas.

It also appears in Lob Lie-By-The-Fire by Juliana H. Ewing, Troll Fell by Katherine Langrish, Abbeychurch by Charlotte M. Yonge and Dear Brutus by J. M. Barrie (as "Lob, the ancient Puck").

The comic book character Hellboy fills in some of the credentials of a lubber fiend. He was born of a witch and the devil, he has a tail, and he serves men, though not for milk. He can therefore be seen as a modern-day lubber fiend.

A creature called a lubberkin appears in The Witcher 3: Wild Hunt, in which it is a type of protective household spirit. The title character Geralt explicitly compares it to a hob.

See also
 Wirry-cow

References

External links
 Lob Lie-By-The-Fire, by Juliana H. Ewing
 The Red Axe, by S. R. Crocket

English folklore
Northumbrian folklore
European demons
English legendary creatures
Hobgoblins